Trick & True was a South Korean variety show, which aired on KBS2, KBS' channel for entertainment shows. The show was hosted by television comedy show host Jun Hyun-moo, Kim Jun-hyun and Lee Eun-gyeol. The show replaced Talents for Sale as it got second highest rating, 6.9% in its pilot episode.

Format 
The show displayed four acts, performed by either a magician or a KAIST scientist, and it was the guests' job to figure out where the act was purely a magic trick or based on flawed scientific theory or an actual scientific phenomenon. After each answer, the opponent could choose to attempt to modify the act to make it a magic trick or more scientific based on the act.

Episode and ratings

2016

2017

References

External links 
 

2016 South Korean television series debuts
2017 South Korean television series endings
Korean-language television shows
Korean Broadcasting System original programming